Narasapuram revenue division (or Narasapuram division) is an administrative division in the West Godavari district of the Indian state of Andhra Pradesh. It is one of the 2 revenue divisions in the district which consists of 10 mandals under its administration. Narasapuram is the divisional headquarters of the division.

Administration 
The mandals in the division are:

See also 
List of revenue divisions in Andhra Pradesh
List of mandals in Andhra Pradesh

References 

Revenue divisions in West Godavari district
Revenue divisions in Andhra Pradesh